Polly Courtney is an English author and media commentator. She is best known as the author of the novels Golden Handcuffs and Poles Apart.

Background
In her early years, Courtney was a straight-A student who spent her free time playing a multitude of sports and playing violin with various orchestras and string quartets. She grew up in London. Courtney graduated from the University of Cambridge with a first-class degree in mechanical engineering, and worked in investment banking for two years before resigning to spend time writing her first novel based on her experiences in the City. In an interview, she claimed this was due to the strenuous hours and pressures synonymous with the banking culture.

Fiction

Courtney has written a number of novels. Her early novels, Golden Handcuffs and Poles Apart, were self-published, based on her experiences as an investment banker and the story of a Polish migrant acquaintance. Her publishing success earned her a three-book publishing deal with HarperCollins imprint, Avon. At the release of It's a Man's World in 2011, Courtney announced plans to return to self-publishing because she did not agree with the chick lit marketing approach used by HarperCollins. On returning to self-publishing, Courtney said in an interview that she was pleased to have regained control. Feral Youth (2013) is based on Courtney's experiences of the London riots and her concerns that more unrest would be only a matter of time.

Bibliography

Golden Handcuffs (2007)
Poles Apart (2008)
The Day I Died (2009)
Defying Gravity (2010)
The Fame Factor (2010)
It's a Man's World (2011)
Feral Youth (2013)

Non-fiction

Courtney has written commentary pieces on city culture, women in the workplace, Polish migrants, lads' mags, sexism in publishing and youth discontentment for The Observer, The Guardian, The Independent, The Sunday Times, The Evening Standard, Female First, Grazia and Huffington Post.

References

External links
 Courtney's Official Website

English women novelists
British chick lit writers
Alumni of Trinity College, Cambridge
Living people
1979 births
Place of birth missing (living people)
Writers from London